Hoverioptera is a genus of crane fly in the family Limoniidae.

Distribution
Madagascar, Comoros & Switzerland.

Species
Subgenus Hoverioptera Alexander, 1963
H. ambricola (Alexander, 1951)
Subgenus Tesserioptera Mendl & Geiger, 1992
H. pilosa Mendl & Geiger, 1992

References

Limoniidae
Nematocera genera
Diptera of Africa
Diptera of Europe